The 2005–06 Ukrainian Second League is the 15th season of 3rd level professional football in Ukraine. The competitions are divided into three regional groups – A, B, C. This season was known for a high volume of withdrawals from the competition.

Team changes

Newly admitted 
The following team was promoted from the 2005 Ukrainian Football Amateur League:
 FC Yalos Yalta – (debut)

The 2004 Ukrainian Football Amateur League participant:
 FC Kremin Kremenchuk – (returning after an absence of 4 seasons)
 FC Sokil Berezhany – (returning after an absence of 13 seasons)
 FC Khimik Krasnoperekopsk – (debut)
 FC Yednist' Plysky – (debut)

The following teams were due to special circumstances:
 MFC Zhytomyr – (debut)
 FC Zhytychi Zhytomyr – (debut)
 OFC Zhytychi Zhytomyr is regarded a successor of FC Polissya Zhytomyr as the main regional club where o stands for oblast (region).
 FC Arsenal Kharkiv – (returning after an absence of 3 seasons)
 There was created FC Kharkiv that was admitted to the 2005–06 Ukrainian Premier League in place of Arsenal, while the latter restarted from the Second League.

Three more teams were also admitted:
 FC Kryvbas-2 Kryvyi Rih – (returning after an absence of 1 seasons)
 FC Kharkiv-2 – (debut)
 FC Knyazha Shchaslyve – (debut)

Relegated from the First League 
 FC Polissya Zhytomyr dissolved during the interseason period

Renamed / Replaced 
 FC Osvita Borodianka before the season moved to Kyiv becoming FC Osvita Kyiv. That team lasted until the end of 2005 and in 2006 it was replaced with FC Boyarka 2006.
 Before the season FC Enerhiya Yuzhnoukrainsk was known as FC Olimpiya AES (Atomic Electric Station) Yuzhnoukrainsk.

Group A

Location map

Standings

Top goalscorers

Group B

Location map

Standings

Top goalscorers

Group C

Location map

Standings

Top goalscorers 

Notes:

See also 
 2005–06 Ukrainian Premier League
 2005–06 Ukrainian First League
 2005–06 Ukrainian Cup

References 

Ukrainian Second League seasons
3
Ukra